The Yatsenko I-28 was a 1930s Soviet single-seat fighter designed by Vladmir Yatsenko and first flown in 1939. The I-28 was a low-wing cantilever monoplane of mixed construction powered by a  Tumansky M-87 radial piston engine. It had an enclosed single-seat cockpit with a rearwards sliding canopy. The wing had an inverted-gull shape to reduce the length of the retractable main landing legs. The prototype was destroyed shortly after the first flight but an order was placed for 30 production aircraft. Also ordered was a prototype of an attack version, the I-28Sh. Although the first five production aircraft were completed the programme was cancelled in early 1940.

Variants
I-28.1
First prototype powered by a Tumansky M-87A radial engine.
I-28.2
Second prototype powered by a Tumansky M-87B radial engine.
I-28
Production variant, canceled. 
I-28Sh
Proposed attack variant, not built.

Specifications (I.28-2)

See also

References

Notes

Bibliography

 

1930s Soviet fighter aircraft